Institute of Cancer of São Paulo or  is located in the city of São Paulo, Brazil. Is the largest hospital of cancer of Brazil and Latin America. Founded in 2008, the institute has 580 beds, 19 elevators (21 persons each), 28 floors, 120 medical consulting rooms, 1.3 thousand surgeries/month, 6 thousand sessions of chemotherapy/month, 420 sessions of radiotherapy/month.

References

Hospitals in São Paulo
Cancer hospitals
Cancer organizations
Cancer Institute
Hospitals established in 2008